Elections to Gedling Borough Council in Nottinghamshire were held on 2 May 2019, the same day as the other local government elections in England and Northern Ireland. The election used the nineteen wards created as a result of boundary commission recommendations formulated for the 2015 contest, with each division electing between one and three Councillors using the first-past-the-post electoral system. A total of 41 representatives were elected.

After the 2015 election, a Labour majority administration of 25 was formed. In 2019, Labour gained four seats, increasing their numbers to 29, eight clear of the Council's majority threshold.

Summary

Election result

|-

Ward results

Bestwood St Albans

Calverton

Carlton

Carlton Hill

Cavendish

Colwick

Coppice

Daybrook

Dumbles

Ernehale

Gedling

Netherfield

Newstead Abbey

Phoenix

Plains

Porchester

Redhill

Trent Valley

Woodthorpe

By-elections

Cavendish

References

2019 English local elections
2010s in Nottinghamshire
May 2019 events in the United Kingdom
2019